Quihi is a settlement in Medina County, in the U.S. state of Texas. In 1936, Quihi received centennial marker Number 5537, a gray granite marker placed to commemorate the Texas Centennial.

Establishment
In 1845, basque empresario Henri Castro laid out the town on Quihi Lake. The first of Castro's colony's families who arrived in 1846 were from the Alsace region.

One week after their arrival, two families were slaughtered by Indians, the colonists tried to fortify the settlement against Indian depredations, but were targets of repeated incidents until the 1870s.

Bethlehem Lutheran Church was established in 1852, and a private school opened in 1856.

Post office
Louis Boehle was the first postmaster when the Quihi post office was established in 1854. The post office was discontinued in 1872, and the mail routed to New Fountain.

20th and 21st centuries
The Quihi Schützen Verein (marksmen club) was established in 1890. The club is still active but renamed the Quihi Gun Club and claiming a county-wide membership of upwards of 1,000.

The Quihi population has fluctuated over the years, but has remained small.

References

External links

Quihi Gun Club & Dance Hall

Populated places in Medina County, Texas
Populated places established in 1846
San Antonio–El Paso Road
1846 establishments in Texas